Carina Marianne Fundahn (née Pettersson; born 1967) is a Swedish politician and member of the Riksdag, the national legislature. A member of the Social Democratic Party, she has represented Skåne County South since September 2018.

References

1958 births
Living people
Members of the Riksdag 2018–2022
Members of the Riksdag 2022–2026
Members of the Riksdag from the Social Democrats
Women members of the Riksdag
21st-century Swedish women politicians